The Cabo Verdean diaspora refers to both historical and present emigration from Cape Verde. Today, more Cabo Verdeans live abroad than in Cape Verde itself. The country with the largest number of Cape Verdeans living abroad is the United States.

Notable people of Cabo Verdean descent

Michael Beach - American actor of Cabo Verdean descent
Blu Cantrell - singer
José Ramos Delgado - association football player
Peter Gomes - American preacher and theologian
Ryan Gomes - former basketball player for the Boston Celtics, now playing for the Minnesota Timberwolves
Tony Gonzalez - former player for the Atlanta Falcons, now an analyst on Fox NFL’s pregame show
Henrik Larsson - former football player for Celtic F.C., FC Barcelona, Manchester United and Helsingborgs IF 
George N. Leighton - retired American judge
Dave Leitao - basketball coach at DePaul University
Lura - a singer born in Portugal to parents from the Cape Verde islands
Davey Lopes - former Major League Baseball second baseman and manager
Lisa "Left Eye" Lopes - singer and rapper from the group TLC
Nani - Valencia C.F. (football) winger
Paul Pena - singer, songwriter, guitarist, and subject of the documentary Genghis Blues
Amber Rose - model, recording artist, actress and socialite
Horace Silver - jazz pianist and composer
Tavares - R&B/Soul group composed of five brothers
José António Tavares dos Anjos - historian 
Patrick Vieira - football (soccer) player whose career has involved spells at French, Italian, UK and US clubs
Nancy Vieira - singer based in Lisbon
Alexis Nikole Nelson - American forager and TikTok creator

International communities

Africa
 Cape Verdean Angolan
 Cape Verdean Guinea-Bissauan
 Cape Verdean Sao Tomese
 Cape Verdeans in Senegal
 Cape Verdeans in South Africa

Europe
 Cape Verdeans in the Netherlands 
 Cape Verdeans in France
 Cape Verdeans in Belgium
 Cape Verdeans in Italy
 Cape Verdeans in Luxembourg - In 1995, it was estimated that there were 3,000 people of Cape Verdean descent in Luxembourg.  By 2000, according to official statistics, Cape Verdean Luxembourger numbered 1,700 individuals.  "The actual figure may be 4,000, almost 1% of the total population, which would make it the highest ratio of Cape Verdeans in any foreign country."
 Cape Verdeans in Portugal
 Cape Verdeans in Spain
 Cape Verdeans in Switzerland
 Cape Verdeans in Ireland

North America
 Cape Verdean American
 Cape Verdeans in Canada
 Cape Verdeans in Cuba

South America
 Cape Verdean Argentines
 Cape Verdeans in Brazil
 Cape Verdeans in Bolivia

See also 
 History of Cape Verde
 List of Cape Verdeans
 :Category:People of Cape Verdean descent

References